Thomas Edward Henderson (born January 26, 1952) is an American former professional basketball player born in Newberry, South Carolina.

A tough-minded 6'4" guard from the University of Hawaii, Henderson was selected by the Atlanta Hawks in the first round of the 1974 National Basketball Association Draft.  He went on to have a productive nine-year (1974–1983) professional career, playing for the Hawks, the Washington Bullets, and the Houston Rockets.  Henderson accumulated 6,088 career points and 3,136 career assists, and he reached the NBA Finals three times, winning with the Bullets in 1978.

Since retiring from basketball, Henderson has worked as an administrator at a Houston-area juvenile facility.

While still an amateur as a college student, Henderson was on the United States basketball team at the 1972 Summer Olympics and was part of the controversial 1972 Olympic Men's Basketball Final.

Henderson and the rest of the team have never accepted the silver medal.

References

External links
 
 Where Are They Now? at NBA.com/Rockets

1952 births
Living people
African-American basketball players
All-American college men's basketball players
American men's basketball players
Atlanta Hawks draft picks
Atlanta Hawks players
Basketball players at the 1972 Summer Olympics
Basketball players from South Carolina
DeWitt Clinton High School alumni
Hawaii Rainbow Warriors basketball players
Houston Rockets players
Medalists at the 1972 Summer Olympics
Olympic silver medalists for the United States in basketball
People from Newberry, South Carolina
San Jacinto Central Ravens men's basketball players
Shooting guards
Washington Bullets players
21st-century African-American people
20th-century African-American sportspeople